Nur Ali Beyk (also Romanized as Nūr ‘Alī Beyk; also known as Nūr ‘Alī Beg and Nūr ‘Alī Beyg) is a village in Nur Ali Beyk Rural District, in the Central District of Saveh County, Markazi Province, Iran. At the 2006 census, its population was 1,399, in 382 families.

References 

Populated places in Saveh County